Taulant Fatmir Seferi (born 15 November 1996) is an Albanian professional footballer who plays as a forward for Ukrainian Premier League club Vorskla Poltava and the Albania national team.

Club career

Early career
Seferi started his youth career at his hometown club FK Milano Kumanovë. Then in 2011 he moved at FK Rabotnički.

Rabotnički
He made his debut with FK Rabotnički on 5 October 2013 against Bregalnica Štip at the age of 16 years, 10 months and 20 days by coming on as a substitute in the 90'+1 minute in place of Krste Velkoski. He scored his first goal on 23 November 2013 against Shkëndija Tetovo where he came in as a substitute in the 61st minute in place of Demir Imeri and scored in the 81st minute the last goal of the match which finished in the 5–0 victory. He finished his first season at Rabotnički with 16 appearances and 3 goals. Then he played 12 matches in the 2014–15 season.

Young Boys
In 2015 Seferi moved to Switzerland joining BSC Young Boys. Initially he played one match with the under-21 team in 1. Liga Classic. Then he debuted with the first team on 14 February 2015 against Grasshoppers coming on as a substitute in the 78th minute in place of Renato Steffen. Five days later he made it his UEFA debut playing in the 2014–15 UEFA Europa League - Round of 32 match against Everton coming on as a substitute once again in place of Renato Steffen in the 79th minute. He became a regular member of the first team under coach Uli Forte participating in every team's match. In March 2015 he suffered a hard knee injury which made him have a knee-operation. The injury kept him out of play for one year and half. He returned to the pitch in October 2016 playing with the under-21 team. He returned to the first team on 5 February 2017 playing against Sion as an 88th-minute substitute in place of Thorsten Schick.

On 10 July 2019, Seferi was loaned out to Neuchâtel Xamax FCS for the rest of the season.

Tirana
Seferi joined Albanian club and reigning Kategoria Superiore champions KF Tirana on 4 January 2021 on loan for the remainder of the 2020-21 season. He made his debut for the club in the league on 16 January 2021 in a 2–1 home win against Kastrioti, coming on in the 53rd minute for Ardit Toli. His first goal came on 31 January 2021 against Apolonia, where he scored the winner in the 77th minute with a right-footed shot from an Ernest Muçi assist. After signing permanently with Tirana on a three-year contract, Seferi was loaned out to champions Teuta Durrës for their Champions League qualification matches.

Seferi was one of the main players for Tirana as they won the 26th Kategoria Superiore title in the 2021–22 season, scoring 19 goals in 35 appearances. Despite being level on goals with Laçi's Saliou Guindo for the league's Golden Boot award, Seferi missed it because he had played more matches than him. During this season, he also formed a notable partnership with the young emerging striker Redon Xhixha, with the duo having scored or assisted 49 of Tirana's 64 league goals.

International career

Macedonia

Senior
Seferi played his first international game with the Macedonia national team on 26 May 2014 in a 2–0 win against Cameroon, coming on as a substitute for Besart Abdurahimi in the 57th minute of that game. By doing so, he became the youngest player ever to appear for Macedonia at 17 years and 6 months, overtaking the previous record holder Goran Pandev. Before Seferi, Pandev held that mark at 17 years, 10 months and 11 days during the friendly match against Turkey on 6 June 2001.

Albania

Under-21
In January 2017 media reported that the newly appointed Albania under-21 national team coach Alban Bushi had convinced Seferi to play for the side. In a press conference later, coach Bushi declared that he had invited Seferi for a gathering stage at the same month but Seferi was not permitted by club due to a preparation stage. The Albanian Football Association proceeded to give Seferi the Albanian passport to make him eligible for Albania U21 in the competitive tournament 2019 UEFA European Under-21 Championship qualification. On 18 March 2017, he was re-invited again at under-21 national side for a double friendly match against Moldova U21 on 25 and 27 March 2017. Two days later he received the Albanian citizenship by president Bujar Nishani among Elvir Maloku & Çlirim Shabani, to become eligible to play for Albania in competitive matches. He made his debut for Albania under-21 against Moldova on 25 March playing as a starter in a goalless draw. In other match against the same opponent two days later, Seferi played once more as a starter in a 2–0 victory.

Seferi was called up for the friendly match against France U21 on 5 June 2017 and the 2019 UEFA European Under-21 Championship qualification opening match against Estonia U21 on 12 June 2017. He played against France U21 as a first-half substitute for Endri Çekiçi as Albania was defeated 3–0. On 8 June 2017, Seferi received the go ahead from FIFA to be eligible to play for Albania U21 in competitive matches. He made his competitive debut for Albania U21 against Estonia U21 on 12 June 2017 playing the full 90-minutes match in a goalless draw.

Senior
Seferi received his first senior call-up by manager Edoardo Reja for the closing fixtures of UEFA Euro 2020 qualifying against Andorra and France in November 2019. He made his senior debut for Albania against the first one, playing as a second-half substitute as the match ended in a disappointing 2–2 draw at Elbasan Arena.

Seferi was used sparingly in the team's campaign in 2020–21 UEFA Nations League C, collecting only 90 minutes from just three appearances. Albania topped their group and was promoted to League B. On 5 June 2022, Seferi scored his first international goal for Albania in a 1–1 away draw against Iceland in the opening fixture of 2022–23 UEFA Nations League B.

Career statistics

Club

International

International goals

Scores and results list Albanian goal tally first, score column indicates score after each Seferi goal.

Honours
Tirana
 Kategoria Superiore: 2021–22

Rabotnički
 Macedonian First League: 2013–14
 Macedonian Cup: 2013–14

Young Boys
 Swiss Super League runner-up: 2014–15, 2015–16, 2016–17

References

External links
 
 
 
 Taulant Seferi profile at FSHF.org

1996 births
Living people
Sportspeople from Kumanovo
Albanian footballers from North Macedonia
Association football wingers
Association football forwards
Albanian footballers
Albania under-21 international footballers
Albania international footballers
Macedonian footballers
North Macedonia youth international footballers
North Macedonia under-21 international footballers
North Macedonia international footballers
Dual internationalists (football)
FK Rabotnički players
BSC Young Boys players
FC Wohlen players
Neuchâtel Xamax FCS players
KF Tirana players
FC Vorskla Poltava players
Swiss Super League players
Swiss Challenge League players
Ukrainian Premier League players
Macedonian expatriate footballers
Albanian expatriate footballers
Macedonian expatriate sportspeople in Switzerland
Albanian expatriate sportspeople in Switzerland
Expatriate footballers in Switzerland
Albanian expatriate sportspeople in Ukraine
Expatriate footballers in Ukraine